"Honky Tonk Crowd" is a song written by Larry Cordle and Lionel Delmore, and recorded by American country music artist John Anderson. It was released in August 1986 as the first single from the album Countrified.  The song reached number 10 on the Billboard Hot Country Singles & Tracks chart. It was his last Top 10 hit on that chart until "Straight Tequila Night" in late 1991-early 1992.

Chart performance
"Honky Tonk Crowd" debuted at number 65 on the U.S. Billboard Hot Country Singles & Tracks for the week of August 16, 1986.

References

1986 songs
John Anderson (musician) songs
Songs written by Larry Cordle
Song recordings produced by Jim Ed Norman
Warner Records singles
1986 singles
Songs written by Lionel Delmore